Faerie Glen Nature Reserve is a nature reserve at the western limit of the Bronberg in the east of Pretoria, South Africa.

History
It formerly formed a part of the farm Hartbeespoort 304 which belonged to H. W. Struben. On old aerial photographs it is apparent that the flood plain was utilized for crop fields, while the remainder was used for cattle grazing. The reserve constitutes the western part of the Bronberg conservation area, which was declared in 1980. Its highest point is Renosterkop (1,468 m) in the northern part of the reserve.

Fauna and flora

Animal life
Though the smaller mammals like mongooses, hedgehogs, hares, porcupines, Cape clawless otters, bushbabies and small-spotted genets are difficult to observe, one may find signs of their presence. In the winter of 2014 larger game was introduced, namely 16 impala, 9 red hartebeest and 5 Burchell's zebra. During late 2014 one common duiker was released in the reserve, the first spotted eagle-owl house was installed, and a first sighting of caracal was made. The leaf-feeding thrip Liothrips tractabilis, introduced from Argentina, was released in the reserve's flood plain in 2014 to combat the invasive pompom weed.

Birds
Some 150 bird species have been recorded in the reserve. In terms of breeding habitat the grassy floodplain along the Moreleta spruit is especially important for a number of cisticola and widow species, and the riparian vegetation provides breeding habitat for a number of weaver species. The bushy slopes provide foraging habitat for boubous, tchagras and cuckooshrikes, while nightjars emerge at dusk to forage over the slopes and floodplain.

Geography

Moreleta Spruit

A December 2014 assessment of the aquatic life in Moreleta Spruit indicated that it was in a critically modified state, and in poor condition with low biodiversity. The spruit now receives larger inflows than in the past, and greywater is diverted to the river from storm water systems, besides runoff from road surfaces and paved areas. The water quality has been negatively affected by oily road surfaces, lawn fertilizers, litter, constant sewage spills and illegal dumping of hazardous substances.

Geology

Andesitic basalt of the Hekpoort formation is found along the Moreleta Spruit. It was formed in the early Proterozoic, more than 2 billion years ago. Open or filled vesicles, caused by dissolved magma gasses that effervesced from the lava, are evident on the surface of these rocks. Repeated mud flows were deposited over the andesite to form mudstone, which was folded by subsequent earth shocks. An intrusive diabase formation is visible half way up the hillside, interbedded in shale and quartzite along the Struben and Daspoort formations' contact zone. The prominent crest of the ridge consists of quartzite of the Daspoort formation. The formation is undisturbed since its formation, some 2.1 billion years ago, and traces left by water flowing over an ancient river bed are still to be seen. The quartzite layer is tilted to the north, towards a very large, ancient magma chamber to the north of the reserve.

Recreation

Facilities and activities
The reserve has three trails, namely the Hadeda route of 2,3 km, the Acacia route of 3,2 km and the Kiepersol/Cussonia route of 4,2 km. Dogs are allowed only if kept on a leash, and if a dog permit is completed.

Admission fees and times
Visitors of 13 and older pay an entrance fee of R15 each, and persons 60 years and older pay R6 each. Season tickets valid for 6 months are available at R165 to R200. Visiting hours are from 06:00 to 18:00 throughout the year.

Community
The Friends of the Faerie Glen Nature Reserve is an organization that coordinates activities that promote the well-being of the reserve. They meet at regular intervals to eradicate some of the invasive plant species, or to remove litter from the reserve.

References

 Faerie Glen Nature Reserve  www.tshwane.gov.za

Tourist attractions in Pretoria
Nature reserves in South Africa
Protected areas of Gauteng